Ski Santa Fe or Santa Fe Ski Basin is a medium-sized ski resort located in the Sangre de Cristo Mountains in Santa Fe County, New Mexico, United States, 16 miles east of the state capital of Santa Fe. It is the southernmost major ski resort of the Rocky Mountains, and one of the oldest and highest in the nation.

History
In 1936, the first rope tow in New Mexico, powered by a Packard sedan engine, was installed in the Sangre de Cristos at the future site of the resort, overseen by Robert Nordhaus (father of Nobel Prize-winning economist William Nordhaus), a retired lawyer, and a businessman and skier, who also founded the Albuquerque Ski Club and La Madera Ski Area, now known as Sandia Peak Ski Area. Shortly after its installation, he installed a rope tow at La Madera.

During World War II, the 10th Mountain Division trained in the area and helped construct ski runs throughout the southern Rockies.

In 1949, the Sierras de Santa Fe group founded the Santa Fe Ski Basin, and raised the money to construct its first chairlift. In 1950, the basin was purchased by one Joe Juhan and managed by championship skier Ernie Blake, who would go on to found Taos Ski Valley, the largest ski resort in the state.

Description
It is located 16 miles east of the city of Santa Fe. Access is provided from downtown Santa Fe to the base lodge via New Mexico State Road 475.

A large ski lodge, La Casa, is located at the ski base and features three restaurants: La Casa Cafe, Totemoff's Bar & Grill, and Terrace Grill. It also includes gift shops, a rental center, a sports equipment shop, a ski patrol station, lockers, and two ski instruction schools: Chipmunk Corner, for beginner skiers ages 3-11 or snowboarders 5-11; and the Snow Sports School, for ages 10+. Skiers 10-11 years old may opt for either school.

Chipmunk Corner Ski School features a rope tow and a private slope, Chippy Hill. The school operates out of a  building near the base lodge, with classrooms, a cafeteria, and a sports equipment center. It also features the Children's Complex, a childcare center for children ages 6 months-3 years. Children's complex features age appropriate equipment and toys, including highchairs and cribs, an indoor play room, and an outdoor snow play area. Chipmunk Corner and the Children's Complex feature licensed childcare professionals to supervise the children while the parent(s) are skiing on the slopes. 

The resort covers two mountains, Lake Peak and Tesuque Peak. The ski runs run down to the base in a fan shape and include glades for advanced skiers. The resort includes 68 named runs and seven lifts, including a magic carpet lift.

Midway down the slope is another restaurant, Outdoor Grill.

The resort grooms and maintains the snow surface, and, if necessary, can produce new snow. Lodging for the resort is located in the city of Santa Fe.

Ski Santa Fe statistics

Elevation
Base: 
Summit: 
Vertical Rise:

Developed Terrain
Mountains: 2 (Tesuque Peak, Lake Peak)
Skiable Area: 
Trails: 68 total (20%  beginner, 40%  intermediate, 40%  advanced)
Terrain Parks: 1
Average Snowfall:  annually

Lifts
As of 2021, Santa Fe Ski has a total of 7 lifts.

2 double chairlifts

2 triple chairlifts

 
1 quad

2 surface lifts
 1 magic carpet
 1 rope tow

See also
 List of New Mexico ski resorts
 Sandia Peak Ski Area
 Taos Ski Valley

References

Skiing in New Mexico
Ski areas and resorts in New Mexico
Santa Fe County, New Mexico
Sangre de Cristo Mountains